Andrew Russell (born January 26, 1983) is a Canadian sprint canoer who has paddled since he was a young boy, alongside his three brothers at Dartmouth, Nova Scotia's Banook Canoe Club.  He won a silver medal in the C-4 1000 m event at the 2006 ICF Canoe Sprint World Championships in Szeged.

At the 2008 Summer Olympics in Beijing, Russell finished fifth in the C-2 500 m and sixth in the C-2 1000 m events.

References

Sports-reference.com profile

1983 births
Canadian male canoeists
Canoeists at the 2008 Summer Olympics
Canoeists at the 2011 Pan American Games
Living people
Olympic canoeists of Canada
ICF Canoe Sprint World Championships medalists in Canadian
Pan American Games competitors for Canada